Huang Changzhou (born 20 August 1994) is a Chinese track and field athlete who competes in the long jump. He was the bronze medallist at the 2016 IAAF World Indoor Championships.

Training with American coach Randy Huntington, Huang began to improve in a group of Chinese jumpers which included world medallist Li Jinzhe, Asian Games medalist Gao Xinglong and world junior champion Wang Jianan. They represented an emergence of China as a global force in jumping. At age nineteen, Huang took fourth place at the 2013 Chinese Games, clearing  and trailing bronze medallist Zhang Yaoguang by just one centimetre. He began competing on the international track and field circuit and placed third in the long jump at the IAAF World Challenge Beijing meet, sweeping the top three for China with training mates Li and Wang. He cleared eight metres for the first time in the 2014 season, achieving a best of  that August in Beijing.

Huang began to rank highly at global level in 2015. A best of  indoors placed him seventh on the seasonal rankings, then he went further to  outdoors, placing in the top 25 globally. He was selected for the 2015 Asian Athletics Championships held on home turf in Wuhan, but failed to record a valid mark in the qualifying round. He was slightly better at the 2016 Asian Indoor Athletics Championships, but was some way off his best in fifth place.

International competitions

References

External links

All Athletics profile

Living people
1994 births
Chinese male long jumpers
Olympic athletes of China
Athletes (track and field) at the 2016 Summer Olympics
Athletes (track and field) at the 2020 Summer Olympics
21st-century Chinese people